Dunér is an old lunar impact crater that is located in the northern hemisphere on the far side of the Moon. It lies to the southeast of the crater Chernyshev, and west-southwest of the Perkin–Debye crater pair.

This crater has been heavily battered by multiple small impacts, leaving a barely surviving outer rim that forms little more than a circular rise in the surface. The interior is in similar condition, and small craters cover many parts of the crater. The most notable impacts consist of a chain of overlapping small craters that run from near the midpoint and cross the southeastern rim. This chain is greater in length than the diameter of Dunér.

Satellite craters
By convention these features are identified on lunar maps by placing the letter on the side of the crater midpoint that is closest to Dunér.

References

 
 
 
 
 
 
 
 
 
 
 
 

Impact craters on the Moon